Peter J. Delfyett Jr (born March 8, 1959) is an American engineer and Pegasus Professor and Trustee Chair Professor of Optics, ECE & Physics at the University of Central Florida College of Optics and Photonics.

He was awarded the 1996 Presidential Early Career Award for Scientists and Engineers.

He is a Fellow of the American Physical Society and The Optical Society. Delfyett was also elected a member of the National Academy of Engineering in 2021 for contributions to development and commercialization of low-noise, high-power ultrafast semiconductor lasers.

Early life and education 
Delfyett, who is African-American, was born in Queens, New York. When he was in his first grade he was taken to see the film Journey to the Beginning of Time. As a child he played the drums and basketball. He attended the City College of New York, where he studied electrical engineering. Whilst he was a sophomore Delfyett became interested in optics. He was mentored by Robert Alfano. He moved to the University of Rochester for his graduate studies, where he earned a master's degree in 1983. After graduating he returned to the City College of New York for a doctoral degree, re-joining the laboratory of Alfano. His doctoral research focussed on ultrafast spectroscopy. After graduating, Delfyett joined Bell Communication Research (now Iconectiv) where he worked on semiconductor lasers. At Bellcore, Delfyett created the highest power mode-locked diode laser in the world.

Research and career 
In 1993 Delfyett moved to the University of Central Florida College of Optics and Photonics (CREOL), where he was made the Professor of Optics and Photonics. Here he established an Ultrafast Photonics group who worked on semiconductor lasers. He developed the semiconductor laser diode that could achieve the shortest and most intense laser pulse in the world.

Academic service 
Delfyett was a founding member of the National Science Foundation Scientists and Engineers in the School Program. He has served as Editor-in-Chief of the IEEE Journal of Selected Topics in Quantum Electronics and the IEEE Photonics Technology Letters. From 2005-2007 Delfyett served as Director at Large on The Optical Society Board of Directors. In 2020 Delfyett joined the Optica Diversity, Equity and Inclusion Rapid Action Committee.

Awards and honors 

 1993 Black Engineer of the Year Award
 2002 Elected Fellow of IEEE
2004 Elected Fellow of The Optical Society
 2011 American Physical Society Edward A. Bouchet Award. 
2013 National Academy of Inventors Fellow
 2013 President of the National Society of Black Physicists
 2013 Faculty Excellence for Mentoring Doctoral Students
 2014 Medalist from the Florida Academy of Science
 2016 Elected Fellow of SPIE
 2018 City University of New York Townsend Harris Award
 2020 IEEE Photonics Society William Streifer Scientific Achievement Award
 2021 Arthur L. Schawlow Prize in Laser Science, American Physical Society
 2021 Member of the National Academy of Engineering

Selected publications

References

External links 
 Oral history interview transcript with Peter Delfyett on 24 June 2020, American Institute of Physics, Niels Bohr Library & Archives
 

1959 births
Living people
American engineers
City College of New York alumni
University of Central Florida faculty
University of Rochester faculty
Fellows of Optica (society)
Recipients of the Presidential Early Career Award for Scientists and Engineers
Fellows of the American Physical Society